Trikala B.C. may refer to:

 Trikala 2000 B.C., a Greek professional basketball club that existed from 2000 to 2010
 Trikala Aries B.C., a Greek professional basketball club active from 1993 on